Events of 2019 in North Korea.

Incumbents 
 Party Chairman and State Chairman: Kim Jong-un
 President of the Supreme People's Assembly: Kim Yong-nam (until 11 April); Choe Ryong-hae (starting 11 April)
 Premier: Pak Pong-ju (until 11 April); Kim Jae-ryong (starting 11 April)

Events 

1 January: Pyongyang saw in the new year with fireworks, a drone show, and a concert that featured Mansudae Art Troupe, the Phibada Opera Troupe, the National Folk Art Troupe, Kim Won Gyun University of Music, and the Moranbong Band.
10 March: Parliamentary election.
11 April: During the first session of the 14th Supreme People's Assembly, Kim Jae-ryong is appointed premier, replacing Pak Pong-ju after 6 years, and Choe Ryong-hae is appointed president of the presidium, replacing Kim Yong-nam after 21 years.

References

Further reading
 

 
2010s in North Korea
Years of the 21st century in North Korea
North Korea
North Korea